Ralivka is a village (selo) in Sambir Raion, Lviv Oblast, in south-west Ukraine. It hosts the administration of Ralivka rural hromada, one of the hromadas of Ukraine.

On the northern tip of the village, an abandoned Catholic church (from the late 19th century) and an Orthodox church from 1938, are located.

References 

Villages in Sambir Raion